The Social Credit Party of Canada won six seats in the 1979 federal election, all in the province of Quebec.  It also fielded candidates in other provinces.  Some of the party's candidates have their own biography pages; information about others may be found here.

Manitoba

Peter Stevens (Winnipeg—Assiniboine)

Stevens was previously a candidate of the Social Credit Party of Manitoba in the 1977 provincial election.  He listed himself as a manufacturer.

See also
Social Credit Party candidates, 1984 Canadian federal election

Candidates in the 1979 Canadian federal election
, 1979